Masoud Hashemzadeh (born September 21, 1981 in Mianeh, East Azerbaijan) is an Iranian wrestler (Azerbaijani origin). He has competed in two Olympics but has yet to win a medal.

References

External links
 

1981 births
Living people
Wrestlers at the 2004 Summer Olympics
Wrestlers at the 2008 Summer Olympics
Olympic wrestlers of Iran
Asian Games silver medalists for Iran
Asian Games bronze medalists for Iran
Asian Games medalists in wrestling
Wrestlers at the 2002 Asian Games
Wrestlers at the 2006 Asian Games
People from Mianeh
Iranian male sport wrestlers
Medalists at the 2002 Asian Games
Medalists at the 2006 Asian Games
Asian Wrestling Championships medalists
21st-century Iranian people